Samanlıq (also, Samanlykh) is a village and municipality in the Gadabay Rayon of Azerbaijan.  It has a population of 1,824.  The municipality consists of the villages of Samanlıq, Moruxlu, and Rəmə.

References 

Populated places in Gadabay District